The 2014 North East Lincolnshire Council election took place on 22 May 2014 to elect members of North East Lincolnshire Council in England. This was on the same day as other local elections. These elections saw UKIP making significant gains largely at the expense of Labour, and stripping them of their majority on the council.

Council make up
After the 2014 local elections, the  political make up of the council was as follows:

These elections saw UKIP make significant gains on the council, ultimately stripping the Labour administration of a majority. The results led to UKIP heavily targeting the area at the general election the following year, but this came with little success and they would only gain one council seat in 2015, whilst coming third in both the Great Grimsby and Cleethorpes constituencies.

The Liberal Democrats were seen to have had some comfort in holding two of their defensive seats (East Marsh and Park), considering they lost all their defensive seats at the last elections in 2012 and only won one in 2011, but with their failure to regain Yarborough after their remaining councillor defected to Labour, they had their lowest number of councillors on the authority since its creation.

Ward results

Croft Baker

Note: Pidgen was a former Liberal Democrat councillor that represented this ward from 2003 to 2012.

East Marsh

Notes: Beasant was the only winning candidate to have achieved an outright majority of votes (ie: over 50% of the vote share). Darby was elected as a Lib Dem councillor for Yarborough in 2010 and defected to Labour (like many Lib Dem councillors on this authority) mid-term. Dumbrell contested this seat as an Independent in 2008; and then as a Conservative in 2010, 2011 and 2012.

Freshney

Notes: Wheatley previously represented East Marsh from 1999 to 2003. Pickett previously represented the ward of Great Coates (a village which this ward contains) from 1984 to 1988 on the since-abolished Great Grimsby Borough Council which preceded this authority. He is also a former councillor for the South Ward from 2003 to 2010 on this authority.

Haverstoe

Heneage

Humberston & New Waltham

Note: Harness gained his seat at a by-election the previous year, so is theoretically a hold.

Immingham

 

Notes: This result was announced after a series of recounts, due to how marginal the result was between the top two candidates. Swinburn previously represented the ward between 2003 and 2011.

Park

 

Note: Whittingham contested Waltham as a Lib Dem in 2003.

Scartho

Notes: Hudson previously contested Freshney in 2008 as a Conservative, before standing in Great Grimsby in the 2010 general election for UKIP. He also contested Wolds in 2011 and East Marsh in 2012 for UKIP. Dixon previously contested this seat as a Liberal Democrat in 2010 and 2011, and as a Conservative in 2012.

South

Note: Bramley was elected as a Labour councillor in 2010, but defected to UKIP in 2013, so theoretically holds her seat. A recount was called, due to the closeness between her and the runner-up. Pickett is a former councillor for this ward from 2004 to 2012. Hill previously contested this ward as an Independent in 2006, later contesting Sidney Sussex in 2008 and Immingham in 2010 as a Liberal Democrat.

Sidney Sussex

Note: Morland was a former Labour councillor for this ward from 1995 until 1999, when he changed seats to Croft Baker until standing down in 2003. He later became a councillor for this ward again but as a Liberal Democrat from 2006 to 2010. He also stood in the Cleethorpes constituency in the 2010 general election.

Waltham

West Marsh

 

Note: This was the only ward in the Great Grimsby constituency which Labour held on to at these elections. Watkin and Barker are former councillors for this ward who were elected in 1999 as Independents, until losing their seats to Labour in 2010 and 2011 respectively.

Wolds

Yarborough

Note: The incumbent Liberal Democrat councillor, Annie Darby, defected to Labour during her previous term and was selected to contest East Marsh (see above). 

2014 English local elections
2014
2010s in Lincolnshire